Halydaia aurea is a species of tachinid flies in the genus Halydaia of the family Tachinidae.

Distribution
Estonia, Hungary, Poland, Romania, Ukraine, Finland, Bulgaria, Italy, Austria, France, Germany, Switzerland, Japan, Mongolia, Russia, Azerbaijan, China.

References

Diptera of Europe
Diptera of Asia
Taxa named by Johann Egger
Dexiinae
Insects described in 1856